A lever is a mechanical device to multiply force.

Lever may also refer to:

Entertainment and media 
"Lever" (song), a 1998 single by The Mavis's
"The Lever" (song), a 2002 song by Silverchair
The Lever (website), an American  news outlet founded by David Sirota

Other uses 
Lever-action, a firearm action
Lever (surname), and persons with the name
Lever, Portugal, a former civil parish in Portugal
Levee (ceremony), referred to in French as a lever
Lever (company), a US software company
Lever Brothers, British household goods company

See also
Leverage (disambiguation)